The BC New Republican Party was a minor political party in British Columbia, Canada, between 2017 and 2019. It was founded in January 2017 and was based in Richmond with Wei Chen as its leader. Chen had previously been the leader of the Nation Alliance Party and a candidate for the BC Conservative Party in the 2013 general election.

In the 2017 general election, its sole candidate was Lawrence Chen, who ran in the Richmond-Queensborough constituency. Chen was defeated and came in fifth place out of five candidates running. The party was de-registered by Elections BC effective October 2019.

See also
 List of political parties in British Columbia

References

New Republican Party
Richmond, British Columbia
Political parties established in 2017
Political parties disestablished in 2019
2017 establishments in British Columbia
2019 disestablishments in Canada